Cole Toner (born March 13, 1994) is an American football center who is a free agent. He played college football at Harvard and was drafted by the Arizona Cardinals in the fifth round of the 2016 NFL Draft.

College career
Toner started at right tackle for the Harvard Crimson for three and a half years, and was a four-year varsity letterman. He was selected First-team All-Ivy League in 2014 and 2015.  In 2015, he was selected to the Lindy's Preseason All-FCS First-team, the All-New England Team, the STATS FCS All-American First-team, and the AP FCS All-American First-team.  He was also nominated to the Fall 2015 Academic All-Ivy Team, and was a semifinalist for the 2015 National Football Foundation William V. Campbell Trophy (the academic Heisman).

Professional career

Arizona Cardinals
Toner was drafted by the Arizona Cardinals in the fifth round (170th overall) in the 2016 NFL Draft. On May 2, 2016, he signed a four-year contract with the Cardinals.

On September 2, 2017, Toner was waived by the Cardinals.

Cincinnati Bengals
On September 4, 2017, Toner was signed to the Cincinnati Bengals' practice squad. He was released on September 29, 2017.

New England Patriots
On October 9, 2017, Toner was signed to the New England Patriots' practice squad. After being placed on the injured list on October 12, 2017, he was released four days later.

Los Angeles Chargers
On November 7, 2017, Toner was signed to the Los Angeles Chargers' practice squad. He signed a reserve/future contract with the Chargers on January 1, 2018.

On August 2, 2019, Toner was waived/injured by the Chargers and placed on injured reserve. He was waived with an injury settlement on August 7. He was re-signed to the practice squad on October 16. Toner signed a futures contract with the Chargers on December 30, 2019.

On September 5, 2020, Toner was released by the Chargers, and signed to the practice squad the next day. He was elevated to the active roster on October 3 for the team's week 4 game against the Tampa Bay Buccaneers, and reverted to the practice squad after the game. He was signed to the active roster on October 31.

Houston Texans
Toner signed with the Houston Texans on March 22, 2021. He was released on August 31, 2021. He was re-signed to the practice squad on October 12, 2021. He was promoted to the active roster on October 30.

Los Angeles Rams
On November 23, 2022, Toner signed with the practice squad of the Los Angeles Rams. His practice squad contract expired when the team's season ended on January 9, 2023.

References

External links
 Arizona Cardinals bio
 Harvard Crimson bio

1994 births
Living people
People from Greenwood, Indiana
Players of American football from Indiana
American football offensive linemen
Harvard Crimson football players
Arizona Cardinals players
Cincinnati Bengals players
New England Patriots players
Los Angeles Chargers players
Houston Texans players
Los Angeles Rams players